The Progressive Conservative Party of Manitoba ran a full slate of 57 candidates in the 1969 Manitoba general election, and won 22 seats to emerge as the second-largest party in the legislature.  When the New Democratic Party was able to form a minority government under Edward Schreyer, the Progressive Conservatives became the Official Opposition.

Many of the party's candidates have their own biography pages; information about others may be found here.  This page also includes information about Progressive Conservative candidates in by-elections between 1969 and 1973.

By-elections

St. Vital, April 5, 1971: Kenneth Pratt
Kenneth Pratt focused his campaign around opposition to the Schreyer government's plan to amalgamate the City of Winnipeg with surrounding municipalities, including St. Vital.  He received 2,925 votes (31.12%), finishing third in a close contest against successful New Democratic Party candidate Jim Walding and a Liberal candidate who also opposed amalgamation.  After the election, he said that the result "shows the majority of the people are against the government and the one-city plan".

References

1969